Acianthera marumbyana is a species of orchid.

marumbyana